The Battle of Cape St. Vincent was a naval battle that took place off the southern coast of Portugal on 16 January 1780 during the American Revolutionary War. A British fleet under Admiral Sir George Rodney defeated a Spanish squadron under Don Juan de Lángara. The battle is sometimes referred to as the Moonlight Battle because it was unusual for naval battles in the Age of Sail to take place at night. It was also the first major naval victory for the British over their European enemies in the war and proved the value of copper-sheathing the hulls of warships.

Admiral Rodney was escorting a fleet of supply ships to relieve the Spanish siege of Gibraltar with a fleet of about twenty ships of the line when he encountered Lángara's squadron south of Cape St. Vincent. When Lángara saw the size of the British fleet, he attempted to make for the safety of Cádiz, but the copper-sheathed British ships chased his fleet down. In a running battle that lasted from mid-afternoon until after midnight, the British captured four Spanish ships, including Lángara's flagship. Two other ships were also captured, but their final disposition is unclear; some Spanish sources indicate they were retaken by their Spanish crews, while Rodney's report indicates the ships were grounded and destroyed.

After the battle Rodney successfully resupplied Gibraltar and Minorca before continuing on to the West Indies station. Lángara was released on parole, and was promoted to lieutenant general by King Carlos III.

Background

One of Spain's principal goals upon its entry into the American War of Independence in 1779 was the recovery of Gibraltar, which had been lost to Great Britain in 1704. The Spanish planned to retake Gibraltar by blockading and starving out its garrison, which included troops from Britain and the Electorate of Hanover. The siege formally began in June 1779, with the Spanish establishing a land blockade around the Rock of Gibraltar. The matching naval blockade was comparatively weak, however, and the British discovered that small fast ships could evade the blockaders, while slower and larger supply ships generally could not.  By late 1779, however, supplies in Gibraltar had become seriously depleted, and its commander, General George Eliott, appealed to London for relief. A supply convoy was organized, and in late December 1779 a large fleet sailed from England under the command of Admiral Sir George Brydges Rodney.  Although Rodney's ultimate orders were to command the West Indies fleet, he had secret instructions to first resupply Gibraltar and Minorca.  On 4 January 1780 the fleet divided, with ships headed for the West Indies sailing westward.  This left Rodney in command of 19 ships of the line, which were to accompany the supply ships to Gibraltar.

On 8 January 1780 ships from Rodney's fleet spotted a group of sails.  Giving chase with their faster copper-clad ships, the British determined these to be a Spanish supply convoy that was protected by a single ship of the line and several frigates. The entire convoy was captured, with the lone ship of the line, Guipuzcoana, striking her colours after a perfunctory exchange of fire. Guipuzcoana was staffed with a small prize crew and renamed , in honour of Prince William, the third son of the King, who was serving as midshipman in the fleet.  Rodney then detached  and the frigate  to escort most of the captured ships back to England; Prince William was added to his fleet, as were some of the supply ships that carried items likely to be of use to the Gibraltar garrison.

On 12 January , which had lost part of her topmast on 3 January, suffered additional damage and raised a distress flag. The Spanish had learnt of the British relief effort. From the blockading squadron a fleet comprising 11 ships of the line under Admiral Juan de Lángara was dispatched to intercept Rodney's convoy, and the Atlantic fleet of Admiral Luis de Córdova at Cadiz was also alerted to try to catch him. Córdova learnt of the strength of Rodney's fleet, and returned to Cadiz rather than giving chase. On 16 January the fleets of Lángara and Rodney spotted each other around 1:00 pm south of Cape St. Vincent, the southwestern point of Portugal and the Iberian Peninsula. The weather was hazy, with heavy swells and occasional squalls.

Battle

Rodney was ill, and spent the entire action in his bunk.  His flag captain, Walter Young, urged Rodney to give orders to engage when the Spanish fleet was first spotted, but Rodney only gave orders to form a line abreast.  Lángara started to establish a line of battle, but when he realised the size of Rodney's fleet, he gave orders to make all sail for Cadiz.  Around 2:00 pm, when Rodney felt certain that the ships seen were not the vanguard of a larger fleet, he issued commands for a general chase. Rodney's instructions to his fleet were to chase at their best speed, and engage the Spanish ships from the rear as they came upon them.  They were also instructed to sail to the lee side to interfere with Spanish attempts to gain the safety of a harbour, a tactic that also prevented the Spanish ships from opening their lowest gun ports. Because of their copper-sheathed hulls (which reduced marine growths and drag), the ships of the Royal Navy were faster and soon gained on the Spanish.

The chase lasted for about two hours, and the battle finally began around 4:00 pm. Marlborough and Ajax then passed Princessa to engage other Spanish ships. Princessa was eventually engaged in an hour-long battle with  before striking her colours at about 5:30. By 6:00 pm it was getting dark, and there was a discussion aboard , Rodney's flagship, about whether to continue the pursuit. Although Captain Young is credited in some accounts with pushing Rodney to do so,  Gilbert Blane, the fleet physician, reported it as a decision of the council.

The chase continued into the dark, squally night, leading to it later being known as the "Moonlight Battle", since it was uncommon at the time for naval battles to continue after sunset. At 7:30 pm,  came upon Lángara's flagship , engaging her in a battle lasting over an hour. Fenix takeover was complicated by an outbreak of smallpox aboard Bienfaisant. Captain John MacBride, rather than sending over a possibly infected prize crew, apprised Lángara of the situation and put him and his crew on parole. At 9:15 Montagu engaged Diligente, which struck after her maintopmast was shot away.

The last ship to surrender was Monarca. She nearly escaped, shooting away 's topmast, but was engaged in a running battle with the frigate HMS Apollo. Apollo managed to keep up the unequal engagement until about the time that Rodney's flagship Sandwich came upon the scene around 2:00 am. Sandwich fired a broadside, unaware that Monarca had already hauled down her flag. The British took six ships. Four Spanish ships of the line and the fleet's two frigates escaped, although sources are unclear if two of the Spanish ships were even present with the fleet at the time of the battle. Lángara's report states that San Justo and San Genaro were not in his line of battle (although they are listed in Spanish records as part of his fleet). Rodney's report states that San Justo escaped but was damaged in battle, and that San Genaro escaped without damage. According to one account two of Lángara's ships (unspecified which two) were despatched to investigate other unidentified sails sometime before the action.

Aftermath

With the arrival of daylight, it was clear that the British fleet and their prize ships were dangerously close to a lee shore with an onshore breeze. One of the prizes, San Julián, was recorded by Rodney as too badly damaged to save, and was driven ashore.  Another prize, San Eugenio, was retaken by her crew and managed to reach Cadiz; she was later restored to service within two months, and remained so until taken to pieces at Cadiz in 1804. A Spanish history claims that the prize crews of both ships appealed to their Spanish captives for help escaping the lee shore.  The Spanish captains retook control of their ships, imprisoned the British crews, and sailed to Cadiz. The British reported their casualties in the battle as 32 killed and 102 wounded. The supply convoy sailed into Gibraltar on 19 January, driving the smaller blockading fleet to retreat to the safety of Algeciras.  Rodney arrived several days later, after first stopping in Tangier.  The wounded Spanish prisoners, who included Admiral Lángara, were offloaded there, and the British garrison was heartened by the arrival of the supplies and the presence of Prince William Henry.

After also resupplying Minorca, Rodney sailed for the West Indies in February, detaching part of the fleet for service in the Channel.  This homebound fleet intercepted a French fleet destined for the East Indies, capturing one warship and three supply ships. Gibraltar was resupplied twice more before the siege was lifted at the end of the war in 1783. Admiral Lángara and other Spanish officers were eventually released on parole, the admiral receiving a promotion to lieutenant general. He continued his distinguished career, becoming Spanish Navy Minister in the French Revolutionary Wars. Admiral Rodney was lauded for his victory, the first major victory of the war by the Royal Navy over its European opponents.  He distinguished himself for the remainder of the war, notably winning the 1782 Battle of the Saintes in which he captured the French admiral, Comte de Grasse.  He was, however, criticised by Captain Young, who portrayed him as weak and indecisive in the battle with Lángara. (He was also rebuked by the admiralty for leaving a ship of the line at Gibraltar, against his express orders.) Rodney's observations on the benefits of copper sheathing in the victory were influential in British Admiralty decisions to deploy the technology more widely.

Order of battle

None of the listed sources give an accurate accounting of the ships in Rodney's fleet at the time of the action. Robert Beatson lists the composition of the fleet at its departure from England, and notes which ships separated to go to the West Indies, as well as those detached to return the prizes captured on 8 January to England. He does not list two ships (Dublin and Shrewsbury, identified in despatches reprinted by Syrett) that were separated from the fleet on 13 January. Furthermore, HMS Prince William is sometimes misunderstood to have been part of the prize escort back to England, but she was present at Gibraltar after the action. Beatson also fails to list a number of frigates, including Apollo, which played a key role in the capture of Monarca.

There are some discrepancies between the English and Spanish sources listing the Spanish fleet, principally in the number of guns most of the vessels are claimed to mount.  The table below lists the Spanish records describing Lángara's fleet.  However, Beatson lists all of the Spanish ships of the line at 70 guns (except Fenix, which he lists at 80 guns), and Spanish archives confirm this except for the San Julián with 64 guns.  One frigate, Santa Rosalia, is listed by Beatson at 28 guns. The identify of the second Spanish frigate is different in the two listings. Beatson records her as Santa Gertrudis, 26 guns, with captain Don Annibal Cassoni, while Duro's listing describes her as Santa Cecilia, 34, captain Don Domingo Grandallana; Spanish archives confirm the latter.  Both frigates, whatever their identity, escaped the battle.

References

Sources
 
 
  Reprints Lángara's report.
 
 
 
 
  Reprints numerous British documents concerning Rodney's entire expedition.

Further reading
 
 Sapherson, C. A. and Lenton, J. R. (1986) Navy Lists from the Age of Sail; Vol. 2: 1776–1783. Leeds: Raider Games
 Spinney, David (1969) Rodney. London: Allen & Unwin 
 Trew, Peter. Rodney and The Breaking of the Line Leo Cooper Ltd (2005) 

Conflicts in 1780
Naval battles involving Spain
Naval battles involving Great Britain
Naval battles of the American Revolutionary War involving Spain
Naval battles of the Anglo-Spanish War (1779–1783)
1780 in the British Empire
1780 in Portugal